Donald Boone Whitmire (July 1, 1922 – May 3, 1991) was an American football tackle who played college football from 1941 to 1944 at the University of Alabama and the United States Naval Academy (USNA). He is one of only four college football players to ever be named as an All-American at two different schools. In 1956, Whitmire was elected into the College Football Hall of Fame.

After his graduation from USNA, in the same class as future United States President Jimmy Carter, Whitmire was commissioned an ensign in the United States Navy, where he later reached the rank of rear admiral. While serving with the Seventh Fleet, he commanded Task Force 76, which supported the evacuation of Saigon in April 1975.

After his death on May 3, 1991, he was buried at Arlington National Cemetery.

References

External links

 
 

1922 births
1991 deaths
People from Giles County, Tennessee
Sportspeople from Decatur, Alabama
Players of American football from Alabama
American football tackles
Alabama Crimson Tide football players
Navy Midshipmen football players
All-American college football players
College Football Hall of Fame inductees
United States Navy rear admirals
United States Navy personnel of World War II
United States Navy personnel of the Korean War
United States Navy personnel of the Vietnam War
Deaths from cancer in Virginia
Burials at Arlington National Cemetery